"Driving Away from Home (Jim's Tune)" is a song by British band It's Immaterial. Released as a single in March 1986, it spent eight weeks on the UK Singles Chart, peaking at number 18 in April 1986.

The song has been described by the band as a "British on-the-road song". They initially recorded the song in Milwaukee with Jerry Harrison from the band Talking Heads, but the band was unhappy about Harrison's idea of making the song a country and western pastische and returned to England to record a new version with producer Dave Bascombe. The "Jim's Tune" in the title refers to Jim Lieber, a harmonica-player in a blues band the band saw in a bar in Milwaukee. He was invited to record in the studio and the band was so happy about his playing that they credited him in the title.

Charts

References

1986 songs
1986 singles